The bell curve is typical of the normal distribution.

Bell curve may also refer to:

 Gaussian function, a specific kind of function whose graph is a bell-shaped curve
 The Bell Curve, a 1994 book by Richard J. Herrnstein and Charles Murray
 Bell curve grading, a method of evaluating scholastic performance